Sector 61 (commonly known as Phase 7) is residential sector located in Chandigarh, Punjab. It is covered with Sector 70, Mohali, Sector 71, Mohali, 3B2, Sector 62, Mohali and Sector 52, Chandigarh.

Facilities

Banks
 HDFC Bank
 Punjab National Bank
 Canara Bank
 State Bank of Patiala
 State Bank of India
 ICICI Bank
Axis bank

Healthcare facilities 
 Government Dispensary
 JP Eye Hospital
 Chawala Nursing Home
 Kochar Nursing Home
 Gopal Nursing Home

Educational institutions
 St. Soldier School
 Sant Isher Singh Public School
 Small Wonder School
 Punjabi University Regional Centre for Information Technology and Management
 ICAI Institute
Raj Institute Of Competitions

Religious institutions 
 Gurdwara Bhagat Ravidas Ji
 Brahmkumaris 
 Sanatan Dharma Temple 
 Gurdwara Bibi Bhani

Access
Sector 61 is situated on Sarovar Path. It is well connected with road, rail and air. The nearest airports are Chandigarh Airport and the nearest railway station is SAS Nagar Mohali railway station.  It is entry point from all sides of Punjab towards Mohali Bus Stand. A few CTU local buses also available connecting PGI (Mohali)|PGI and Landran.

References

Mohali
Sectors of Mohali